Francesco Forgione, OFMCap, better known as Padre Pio and as Saint Pio of Pietrelcina (25 May 188723 September 1968), was an Italian Franciscan Capuchin friar, priest, stigmatist, and mystic. He is venerated as a saint in the Catholic Church, celebrated on 23 September.

Pio joined the Capuchins at fifteen and spent most of his religious life in the convent of San Giovanni Rotondo. He was marked by stigmata in 1918, leading to several investigations by the Holy See. Despite temporary sanctions imposed by the Vatican, his reputation kept increasing during his life, attracting many followers to San Giovanni Rotondo. He was involved in the construction of the Casa Sollievo della Sofferenza, a hospital built near the convent of San Giovanni Rotondo.

After his death, his devotion continued to spread among believers all over the world. He was beatified on 2 May 1999 and canonized on 16 June 2002 by Pope John Paul II. His relics are exposed in the sanctuary of Saint Pio of Pietrelcina, next to the convent of San Giovanni Rotondo, now a major pilgrimage site.

Life

Early life
Francesco Forgione was born to Grazio Mario Forgione (1860–1946) and Maria Giuseppa Di Nunzio (1859–1929) on May 25, 1887, in Pietrelcina, a town in the province of Benevento, in the Southern Italian region of Campania. His parents were peasant farmers. He was baptized in the nearby Santa Anna Chapel, which stands upon the walls of a castle. He later served as an altar boy in this same chapel. He had an older brother, Michele, and three younger sisters, Felicita, Pellegrina, and Grazia (who was later to become a Bridgettine nun). His parents had two other children who died in infancy. When he was baptized, he was given the name Francesco. He stated that by the time he was five years old, he had already made the decision to dedicate his entire life to God. He worked on the land up to the age of 10, looking after the small flock of sheep the family owned.

Pietrelcina was a town where feast days of saints were celebrated throughout the year, and the Forgione family was deeply religious. They attended Mass daily, prayed the Rosary nightly, and abstained from meat three days a week in honor of Our Lady of Mount Carmel. Although Francesco's parents and grandparents were illiterate, they narrated Bible stories to their children.

According to the diary of Father Agostino da San Marco (who was later his spiritual director in San Marco in Lamis) the young Francesco was afflicted with a number of illnesses. At six he suffered from severe gastroenteritis. At ten he caught typhoid fever.

As a youth, Francesco reported that he had experienced heavenly visions and ecstasies. In 1897, after he had completed three years at the public school, Francesco was said to have been drawn to the life of a friar after listening to a young Capuchin who was in the countryside seeking donations. The friars there informed them that they were interested in accepting Francesco into their community, but he needed to be better educated.

Francesco's father went to the United States in search of work to pay for private tutoring for his son, to meet the academic requirements to enter the Capuchin Order. It was in this period that Francesco received the sacrament of Confirmation on 27 September 1899. He underwent private tutoring and passed the stipulated academic requirements. On 6 January 1903, at the age of 15, he entered the novitiate of the Capuchin friars at Morcone. On 22 January, he took the Franciscan habit and the name of Fra (Friar) Pio, in honor of Pope Pius I, whose relic is preserved in the Santa Anna Chapel in Pietrelcina. He took the simple vows of poverty, chastity and obedience.

Priesthood

Commencing his seven-year study for the priesthood, Pio travelled to the friary of Saint Francis of Assisi in Umbria. At 17, he fell ill, complaining of loss of appetite, insomnia, exhaustion, fainting spells, and migraines. He vomited frequently and could digest only milk and cheese. Religious devotees point to this time as being that at which inexplicable phenomena began to occur. During prayers for example, Pio appeared to others to be in a stupor, as if he were absent. One of Pio's fellow friars later claimed to have seen him in ecstasy, and levitating above the ground.

In June 1905, Pio's health worsened to such an extent that his superiors decided to send him to a mountain convent, in the hope that the change of air would do him good. This had little impact, however, and doctors advised that he return home. Even there his health failed to improve. Despite this, he still made his solemn profession on 27 January 1907.

In 1910, Pio was ordained a priest by Archbishop Paolo Schinosi at the Cathedral of Benevento. Four days later, he offered his first Mass at the parish church of Our Lady of the Angels. His health being precarious, he was permitted to remain with his family until 1916 while still retaining the Capuchin habit.

On 4 September 1916, however, Pio was ordered to return to his community life. He moved to an agricultural community, Our Lady of Grace Capuchin Friary, located in the Gargano Mountains in San Giovanni Rotondo in the Province of Foggia. At that time the community numbered seven friars. He remained at San Giovanni Rotondo until his death in 1968, except for a period of military service. In the priesthood, Padre Pio was known to perform a number of successful conversions to Catholicism.

Pio was devoted to rosary meditations. He compared weekly confession to dusting a room weekly, and recommended the performance of meditation and self-examination twice daily: once in the morning, as preparation to face the day, and once again in the evening, as retrospection. His advice on the practical application of theology he often summed up in his now famous quote: "pray, hope, and don't worry". He directed Christians to recognize God in all things and to desire above all things to do the will of God.

Many people who heard of him traveled to San Giovanni Rotondo to meet him and confess to him, ask for help, or have their curiosity satisfied. Pio's mother died at the village around the convent in 1928. Later, in 1938, Pio had his elderly father Grazio live with him. His brother Michele also moved in. Pio's father lived in a little house outside the convent, until his death in 1946.

First World War and aftermath

When World War I started, four friars from this community were selected for military service in the Italian army. At that time, Pio was a teacher at the seminary and a spiritual director. When one more friar was called into service, Pio was put in charge of the community. On 15 November 1915, he was drafted and on December 6, assigned to the 10th Medical Corps in Naples. Due to poor health, he was continually discharged and recalled until on 16 March 1918, he was declared unfit for service and discharged completely.

People who had started rebuilding their lives after the war began to see in Pio a symbol of hope. Those close to him attest that he began to manifest several spiritual gifts, including the gifts of healing, bilocation, levitation, prophecy, miracles, extraordinary abstinence from both sleep and nourishment (one account states that Padre Agostino recorded one instance in which Pio was able to subsist for at least 20 days at Verafeno on only the Holy Eucharist without any other nourishment), the ability to read hearts, the gift of tongues, the gift of conversions, and pleasant-smelling wounds.

Pio increasingly became well known among the wider populace. He became a spiritual director, and developed five rules for spiritual growth: weekly confession, daily Communion, spiritual reading, meditation, and examination of conscience.

Rehabilitation

In 1933, Pope Pius XI ordered a reversal of the ban on Pio's public celebration of Mass, arguing, "I have not been badly disposed toward Padre Pio, but I have been badly informed." In 1934, the friar was again allowed to hear confessions. He was also given honorary permission to preach despite never having taken the exam for the preaching license. Pope Pius XII, who assumed the papacy in 1939, even encouraged devotees to visit Pio.

Finally, in the mid-1960s Pope Paul VI (pope from 1963 to 1978) dismissed all accusations against Padre Pio.

La Casa Sollievo della Sofferenza hospital

By 1925, Pio had converted an old convent building into a medical clinic with a few beds intended primarily for people in extreme need. In 1940, a committee was set-up to establish a bigger clinic and donations started to be made. Construction began in 1947.

According to Luzzatto, the bulk of the money for financing the hospital came directly from Emanuele Brunatto, a keen follower of Pio, who had made his fortune in the black market in German-occupied France. The United Nations Relief and Rehabilitation Administration (UNRRA) also contributed 250 million Italian lire.

Lodovico Montini, head of Democrazia Cristiana, and his brother Giovanni Battista Montini (later Pope Paul VI) facilitated engagement by UNRRA. The hospital was initially to be named "Fiorello LaGuardia", but eventually presented as the work of Pio himself. The Casa Sollievo della Sofferenza opened in 1956. Pio handed direct control to the Holy See. However, in order that Pio might directly supervise the project, Pope Pius XII granted him a dispensation from his vow of poverty in 1957. Some of Pio's detractors have subsequently suggested there had been misappropriation of funds.

Death

Pio died in 1968 at the age of 81. His health deteriorated in the 1960s, but he continued his spiritual works. On 21 September 1968, the day after the 50th anniversary of his receiving the stigmata, Pio felt great fatigue. The next day, on 22 September 1968, he was supposed to offer a Solemn Mass, but feeling weak, he asked his superior if he might say a Low Mass instead, as he had done daily for years. Due to a large number of pilgrims present for the Mass, Pio's superior decided the Solemn Mass must proceed. Pio carried out his duties but appeared extremely weak and frail. His voice was weak, and, after the Mass had concluded, he nearly collapsed while walking down the altar steps. He needed help from his Capuchin brothers. This was his last celebration of the Mass.

Early in the morning of 23 September 1968, Pio made his last confession and renewed his Franciscan vows. As was customary, he had his rosary in his hands, though he did not have the strength to pray the Hail Marys aloud, instead repeating the words . At around 2:30a.m., he said, "I see two mothers" (taken to mean his mother and Mary). At 2:30a.m. he died in his cell in San Giovanni Rotondo. With his last breath he whispered, "Maria!"

His body was buried on 26 September in a crypt in the Church of Our Lady of Grace. His Requiem Mass was attended by over 100,000 people. He had often said, "After my death, I will do more. My real mission will begin after my death." The accounts of those who stayed with Pio until the end state that the stigmata had completely disappeared without a scar. Only a red mark "as if drawn by a red pencil" remained on his side, but it disappeared.

Supernatural phenomena
Pio was said to have had mystical gifts such as reading souls, the ability to bilocate and the ability to work favors and healings before they were requested of him. His reported supernatural experiences also include celestial visions, communication with angels and physical fights with Satan and demons. The reports of supernatural phenomena surrounding Pio attracted fame and amazement, even if the Vatican seemed skeptical. Some of these phenomena were reported by Pio himself in letters written to his spiritual directors, while others have been reported by his followers.

Stigmata
Pio wrote in his letters that, early in his priesthood, he experienced bodily marks, pain, and bleeding in locations indicative of the (not yet visible) stigmata. In a letter to his spiritual companion and confessor Father Agostino Gemelli, dated March 21, 1912, Pio wrote of his devotion to the mystical body of Christ and the intuition that he would bear the stigmata. Luzzatto claims that in this letter Pio uses unrecognized passages from a book by the stigmatized mystic Gemma Galgani. Pio subsequently denied that he knew of or owned the cited book.

In a 1915 letter, Agostino asked Pio specific questions, including: when did he first experience visions, whether he was stigmatic, and whether he felt the pains of the Passion of Christ, namely the crowning of thorns and the scourging. Pio replied that he had had visions since his novitiate period (1903 to 1904), and that he was stigmatic, adding that he had been so terrified by the phenomenon that he begged God to withdraw his stigmata. He also wrote that he did not wish the pain to be removed, only the visible wounds, since he considered them to be an indescribable and almost unbearable humiliation.

On 20 September 1918, while hearing confessions, Pio said to have had a reappearance of the physical occurrence of the stigmata. His stigmatism was reported to have continued for fifty years, until the end of his life. The blood flowing from the stigmata purportedly smelled of perfume or flowers. Pio conveyed to Agostino that the pain remained and was more acute on specific days and under certain circumstances. Though he said he would have preferred to suffer in secret, by early 1919, news that he was a stigmatic had begun to spread. Pio often wore red mittens or black coverings on his hands and feet, saying that he was embarrassed by the marks.

Agostino Gemelli claimed that the wounds were consistent with those that soldiers had inflicted on themselves "by the use of a caustic substance". while Amico Bignami considered that Pio's wounds might be a skin necrosis that was hindered from healing through the use of iodine tincture or similar chemicals.

Once made public, the wounds were studied by a number of physicians, some hired by the Vatican as part of an independent investigation. Some claimed that the wounds were unexplainable and never seem to have become infected. Despite seeming to heal they would then reappear periodically. Alberto Caserta took X-rays of Pio's hands in 1954 and found no abnormality in the bone structure. Some critics accused Pio of faking the stigmata, for example by using carbolic acid to make the wounds. Maria De Vito (the cousin of the local pharmacist Valentini Vista at Foggia) testified that the young Pio bought carbolic acid and the great quantity of four grams of veratrine "without presenting any medical prescription whatsoever" and "in great secret". Veratrine is a "mixture of alkaloids", a "highly caustic product": "Veratrine is so poisonous, that only a doctor can decide whether to prescribe it", as the pharmacist Vista stated in front of witnesses. Veratrine was once used as a paralyzing muscle insecticide, primarily against lice, but was also described by pharmacists as an "external stimulant" that renders one insensitive to pain. Pio maintained that the carbolic acid was used to sterilize syringes used for medical treatments and that after being subjected to a practical joke where veratrine was mixed with snuff tobacco, causing uncontrollable sneezing after ingestion, he decided to acquire his own quantity of the substance in order to play the same joke on his confreres; the bishop of Volterra, Raffaello Rossi came to share this view, believing that "Instead of malice, what is revealed here is Padre Pio's simplicity, and his playful spirit", and that "the stigmata at issue are not a work of the devil, nor a gross deceit, a fraud, the trick of a devious and malicious person[...] his "stigmata" do not seem to me a morbid product of external suggestion." Rossi saw these stigmata as a "real fact".

Transverberation

In August 1918, a few weeks before reportedly receiving the stigmata, Pio described a mystical experience during which he felt being pierced and burnt spiritually and physically. According to Pio, this mystical experience began on 5 August and ended on 7 August. Padre Benedetto, his spiritual director, interpreted this phenomenon as a transverberation. Pio later clamied that this experience left a physical wound on his left side. Most witnesses who examined Pio's wounds reported that he had a wound on his left side, around three-inch long and the shape of a cross.

Pio described this experience to Padre Benedetto in a letter dated 21 August 1918:

Bilocation
Pio was believed by his followers to have the gift of bilocation, the ability to be in two places at the same time. There were many accounts of people claiming to have seen Pio all over the world throughout his life, whereas it is well documented that he never left San Giovanni Rotondo from 1918 until his death.

Pio himself reported to have experienced a bilocation in 1905, when he was a young Capuchin student. In a letter sent to his spiritual director, he explained that he was in the choir with another friar when he suddenly found himself far away in a house, where he witnessed a father dying while his wife was delivering a baby girl, then he found himself back in the choir.

When bishop Raffaele Rossi asked him about bilocation as part of a Vatican inquiry, Pio replied: "I don't know how it is or the nature of this phenomenon—and I certainly don't give it much thought—but it did happen to me to be in the presence of this or that person, to be in this or that place; I do not know whether my mind was transported there, or what I saw was some sort of representation of the place or the person; I do not know whether I was there with my body or without it."

Healing
In the 1999 book Padre Pio: The Wonder Worker, a segment by Irish priest Malachy Gerard Carroll describes the story of Gemma de Giorgi, a Sicilian girl whose blindness was believed to have been cured during a visit to Pio. Gemma, who was brought to San Giovanni Rotondo in 1947 by her grandmother, was born without pupils. During her trip to see Pio, the little girl began to see objects, including a steamboat and the sea. Gemma's grandmother did not believe the child had been healed. After Gemma forgot to ask Pio for grace during her confession, her grandmother implored the priest to ask God to restore her sight. Pio told her, "The child must not weep and neither must you for the child sees and you know she sees."

According to the bishop of Volterra, Raffaele Rossi, in charge of investigating Pio: "Of the alleged healings, many are unconfirmed or non-existent. In Padre Pio's correspondence, however, there are some credible declarations that attribute miracles to his intercession. But without medical confirmation it is difficult to reach a conclusion, and the issue remains open."

Odor of sanctity
Many witnesses reported that a mysterious fragrance or aroma seemed to emanate from Pio's stigmata, a phenomenon usually known as the odour of sanctity. The scent emanating from Pio was also noted by Vatican investigator Rossi, who investigated the origins of the scent. In his report, Rossi describes a "very intense and pleasant fragrance, similar to the scent of the violet", and concludes that he was unable to determine the origin of the scent.

Celestial visions
In his letters to his spiritual directors Padre Agostino and Padre Benedetto, Pio reported frequent visions of celestial beings such as visions of Jesus and Mary and visions of his guardian angel. In 1915, when Padre Agostino asked him when he began to have celestial visions, Pio stated in a letter that he started to experience such visions not long after his novitiate, which he completed in 1903. When asked in 1921 by Vatican investigator Raffaele Rossi whether his visions were intellectual of physical, he replied that they were intellectual visions seen through the eyes of the intellect.

Demonic attacks
Pio reported frequent physical attacks from Satan and diabolical creatures, describing in his letters to his spiritual director that he was being physically beaten or tormented by demons. According to the report written by Vatican investigator Raffaele Rossi in 1921, there had been accounts of diabolical assaults and harassment against Pio. When asked about this by Rossi, Pio explicitly confirmed to have experienced malicious visions under human shape and beastly shape.

Prophecy
In 1947, 27-year old Father Karol Józef Wojtyła (later Pope John Paul II) visited Pio, who heard his confession. Austrian Cardinal Alfons Stickler reported that Wojtyła confided to him that during this meeting, Pio told him he would one day ascend to "the highest post in the church, though further confirmation is needed." Stickler said that Wojtyła believed that the prophecy was fulfilled when he became a cardinal. John Paul's secretary, Stanisław Dziwisz, denies the prediction, while George Weigel's biography Witness to Hope, which contains an account of the same visit, does not mention it.

Reading into hearts
It was reported that Padre Pio could read into people's hearts, for example having supernatural knowledge of their sins when receiving them for confession. When asked about this ability by Raffaele Rossi during his investigation in 1921, Padre Pio confirmed he had this mystical gift, declaring to Rossi: "A very few times I happened to feel inside me with clarity someone's fault, or sin, or virtue, of people of whom I had some knowledge, at least generally".

Investigations by the Vatican

The Vatican initially imposed severe sanctions on Pio in the 1920s to reduce publicity about him: he was forbidden from saying Mass in public, blessing people, answering letters, showing his stigmata publicly, and communicating with Padre Benedetto, his spiritual director.

The church authorities decided that Pio be relocated to another convent in northern Italy. 
The local people threatened to riot, and the Vatican left him where he was. A second plan for removal was also changed. Nevertheless, from 1921 to 1922 he was prevented from publicly performing his priestly duties, such as hearing confessions and saying Mass. From 1924 to 1931, the Holy See made statements denying that the events in Pio's life were due to any divine cause.

Luigi Romanelli, medical examination from 1919 
A large number of doctors visited Pio to verify that he was not a braggart. The first to study his wounds was Luigi Romanelli, chief physician of the civil hospital of Barletta, by order of the provincial father superior, on May 15 and 16, 1919. In his report, among other things he wrote: "The injuries he presents to hands are covered with a brown-red membrane, with no bleeding points, no edema and no inflammatory reactions in the surrounding tissues. I am sure that those wounds are not superficial because, by applying the thumb in the palm of the hand and the index finger on the back and applying pressure, one has the exact perception of the existing void."

Amico Bignami, medical examination from 1919 
Two months later, on July 26, pathologist Amico Bignami arrived in San Giovanni Rotondo. Bignami conducted a medical examination of Pio's wounds in 1919 and launched several hypotheses, among which was that the wounds were a skin necrosis that was hindered from healing by chemicals such as iodine tincture.

Giorgio Festa, medical examinations 1919 and 1920 
Festa was a physician who examined Pio in 1919 and 1920. He was obviously impressed by the fragrance of the stigmata. Festa, as Bignami before, had described the side wound as cruciform. In his report to the Holy Office of 1925, Festa arrived at a benevolent verdict and attacked Gemelli's critical view of Pio's stigmata, with theological arguments playing the lead role.

Agostino Gemelli, psychiatric examination 1920 and medical examination 1925 
In 1920, father Agostino Gemelli – a physician and psychologist – was commissioned by Cardinal Rafael Merry del Val to visit Pio and carry out a clinical examination of the wounds. "For this reason, despite having gone to Gargano Peninsula on his own initiative, without being asked by any ecclesiastical authority, Gemelli did not hesitate to make his private letter to the Holy Office a kind of unofficial report on Padre Pio." Gemelli wanted to express himself fully on the matter and wanted to meet the friar. Pio showed a closed attitude towards the new investigator: he refused the visit requesting the written authorization of the Holy Office. Father Gemelli's protests that he believed he had the right to subject the friar to a medical examination of the stigmata were in vain. The friar, supported by his superiors, conditioned the examination to a permit requested through the hierarchy, without taking into account the credentials of Father Agostino Gemelli. Therefore, Gemelli left the convent, irritated and offended for not being allowed to examine the stigmata. He came to the conclusion that Francesco Forgione was "a man of restricted field of knowledge, low psychic energy, monotonous ideas, little volition." Gemelli critically judged Pio: "The case is one of suggestion unconsciously planted by Father Benedetto in the weak mind of Padre Pio, producing those characteristic manifestations of psittacism that are intrinsic to the hysteric mind."

On behalf of the Holy Office, Gemelli re-examined Pio in 1925, writing a report in April 1926. This time Pio allowed him to see the wounds. Gemelli saw as its cause the use of a corrosive substance Pio had applied himself to these wounds. The Jesuit Festa had previously tried to question Gemelli's comments on stigmata in general. Gemelli responded to this criticism in his report and resorted to responding to his knowledge of self-inflicted wounds. He therefore clarified his statements about the nature of Pio's wounds: "Anyone with experience in forensic medicine, and above all in variety by sores and wounds that self-destructive soldiers were presented during the war, can have no doubt that these were wounds of erosion caused by the use of a caustic substance. The base of the sore and its shape are in every way similar to the sores observed in soldiers who procured them with chemical means."

Once again, Gemelli judged Pio's mental abilities as limited: "He [Pio] is the ideal partner with whom former Minister Provincial Father Benedetto is able to create an incubus-succubus pair[...] He is a good priest: calm, quiet, meek, more because of the mental deficiency than out of virtue. A poor soul, able to repeat a few stereotypical religious phrases, a poor, sick man who has learned his lesson from his master, Father Benedetto." Gemelli wrote in 1940 and later several times to the Holy Office on what he considered to be unjustified claims to the sanctity of Pio.

Raffaele Rossi, First Apostolic Visitation of 1921 
The Bishop of Volterra, Raffaele Rossi, Carmelite, was formally commissioned on June 11, 1921 by the Holy Office to make a canonical inquiry concerning Pio. Rossi began his Apostolic Visitation on June 14 in San Giovanni Rotondo with the interrogation of witnesses, two diocesan priests and seven friars. After eight days of investigation, he finally completed a benevolent report, which he sent to the Holy Office on October 4, the feast of St. Francis of Assisi. The extensive and detailed report essentially stated the following: Pio, of whom Rossi had a favorable impression, was a good religious and the San Giovanni Rotondo convent was a good community. The stigmata could not be explained, but certainly were not a work of the devil or an act of gross deceit or fraud; neither were they the trick of a devious and malicious person. During the interviews with the witnesses, which Rossi undertook a total of three times, he let himself be shown the stigmata of the then-34-year-old Pio. Rossi saw these stigmata as a "real fact".

In his notes, which have been put directly on paper, and the final report, Rossi describes the shape and appearance of the wounds. Those in the hands were "very visible". Those in the feet were "disappearing. What could be observed resembled two dot-shaped elevations [literally: 'buttons'] with whiter and gentler skin." As for the chest, it says: "In his side, the sign is represented by a triangular spot, the color of red wine, and by other smaller ones, not anymore, then, by a sort of upside-down cross such as the one seen in 1919 by Dr. Bignami and Dr. Festa." Rossi also made a request to the Holy Office, a chronicle to consult with Pio, who was assembling Father Benedetto, or at least to have the material he has collected so that one day he couls write about the life of Pio.

According to Rossi, "Of the alleged healings, many are unconfirmed or non-existent. In Padre Pio's correspondence, however, there are some credible declarations that attribute miracles to his intercession. But without medical confirmation it is difficult to reach a conclusion, and the issue remains open." According to Lucia Ceci, Rossi could not find any of the attributed miracles.

When Rossi asked him about bilocation, Pio replied: "I don't know how it is or the nature of this phenomenon—and I certainly don't give it much thought—but it did happen to me to be in the presence of this or that person, to be in this or that place; I do not know whether my mind was transported there, or what I saw was some sort of representation of the place or the person; I do not know whether I was there with my body or without it."

John XXIII, investigations and tape recordings, after 1958 
Pope John XXIII was skeptical of Padre Pio. At the beginning of his tenure, he learned that Father Pio's opponents had placed listening devices in his monastery cell and confessional, recording his confessions with tape. Outside his semi-official journal, John XXIII wrote on four sheets of paper that he prayed for "PP" (Padre Pio) and the discovery by means of tapes, if what they imply is true, of his intimate and indecent relationships with women from his impenetrable praetorian guard around his person pointed to a terrible calamity of souls. John XXIII had probably never listened to the tapes himself, but assumed the correctness of this view: "The reason for my spiritual tranquillity, and it is a priceless privilege and grace, is that I feel personally pure of this contamination that for forty years has corroded hundreds of thousands of souls made foolish and deranged to an unheard-of degree." According to Luzzatto, the Vatican had not ordered this wiretap. In another journal note, John XXIII wrote that he wanted to take action. In fact, he ordered another Apostolic Visitation.

Carlo Maccari, Second Apostolic Visitation of 1960 
Father Carlo Maccari was Secretary-General of the Diocese of Rome and met Pio nine times altogether. There was reciprocal mistrust between Pio and Maccari, who wrote in his diary: "Reticence, narrowness of mind, lies - these are the weapons he uses to evade my questions ... Overall impression: pitiful." Maccari demanded Father Pio's omission to practice kisses after the confession for the lay sisters. Maccari noted in his report that Pio had inadequate religious education. He works a lot for a man of his age. He is not an ascetic and has many connections to the outside world. In general, there is too much mixing of the "sacred" and the "all too human". In his report, Maccari noted by name the women who revealed at which time to have been the lover of Pio, but without assessing the veracity of these statements. Maccari focused on assessing the fanaticism of Pio's social environment, describing it as "religious conceptions that oscillate between superstition and magic." Maccari called Pio's supporters "a vast and dangerous organization." Pio never had his own supporters advised to moderation. Maccari wondered how God could allow "so much deception."

Maccari finished his critical report with a list of recommendations for further dealing with Father Pio. The brothers of Santa Maria delle Grazie should gradually be relocated, a new abbot should come from outside the region. No one should be allowed to confess to Pio more than once a month. The hospital was to be given new statutes to sever the responsibilities of the medical and spiritual "healing" capuchins. Following Maccari's Apostolic Visitation, John XXIII noted in his diary that he sees Father Pio as a "straw idol" (idolo di stoppa).

Personal views

Religion 

Pio was a strong proponent of weekly confession, describing it as "the soul's bath." Pio established five rules for spiritual growth, which included weekly confession, daily communion, spiritual reading, meditation, and frequent examination of one's conscience." He taught his spiritual followers that suffering is a special sign of God's love, for it makes you "resemble His divine son in His anguish in the desert and on the hill of Calvary."

Pio held a harsh attitude towards vain women, stating: "Women who satisfy their vanity in their dress can never put on the life of Jesus Christ; moreover they even lose the ornaments of their soul as soon as this idol enters into their heart."

Pio also held to strict rules concerning modesty, and refused confession to women who did not wear skirts that extended a minimum of  past the knees. He posted a notice at the entrance of the Church of St. Mary of All Graces in San Giovanni Rotondo, reading: "The Church is the house of God. It is forbidden for men to enter with bare arms or in shorts. It is forbidden for women to enter in trousers, without a veil on their head, in short clothing, low necklines, sleeveless or immodest dresses."

Pio was deeply troubled by the changes the church was undergoing following the Second Vatican Council. Pio accepted the changes the council brought, but immediately requested a dispensation to celebrate the Tridentine mass, which was granted. When visited by Cardinal Antonio Bacci, Pio let a small complaint slip in the Cardinal's presence: "For pity sake, end the Council quickly." In 1966, the Father General of the Franciscans came to Pio to ask for prayers regarding the reformation of the Franciscans. Upon hearing about the "new constitutions", Pio replied "That is all nothing but destructive nonsense."

However, although he was distraught over the changes, he emphasized obedience to the church. On one occasion, Pio met with Suor Pia, a former nun who left her order following the council. Suor Pia was a traditionalist and was upset at the changes made by her liberal superiors, causing her to leave her convent at the age of seventy. Pio burst into tears and snapped at her over this decision, telling her "They are wrong and you are right, but you still must obey. You must return." She refused, causing him to weep uncontrollably and continue praying for her.

Following the publication of Humanae vitae, Pio was distraught over criticism aimed at the encyclical. He wrote Pope Paul VI over this, affirming his obedience to the Church's teaching on birth control and reassuring Paul VI in his time of need. Pio informed the pope that he would offer up his daily prayers and suffering for the pontiff, due to Paul VI's defense of "eternal truth, which never changes with the passing of years."

As Pio grew older, he became increasingly distrustful of television. After the Second World War, when Pio's nephew, Ettorne Masone, asked Pio for advice on opening a movie house, Pio warned him to be careful about what movies he would show. Pio stated "You don't want to contribute to the propagation of evil." By the 1960s, Pio was displeased that the Capuchins were now permitted to watch television. To Pio, television was responsible for the destruction of the family life and he strongly warned others not to buy one when asked. On one occasion, when asked about motion pictures, Pio replied "The devil is in it!" On another occasion, Pio told a penitent in confession that the reason the penitent's car had broken down the day before was because the penitent was driving to a movie theater.

Pio became exceedingly pessimistic about the state of the world towards the end of his life. When asked what awaited the world in the future, Pio replied "Can't you see the world is catching on fire?" In his last three years, he began to withdraw further from life, feeling unworthy and unsure of his salvation. Pio frequently asked his superior, "Give me the obedience to die."

Politics 
Padre Pio was not especially concerned with politics, but voted in Italian elections and voiced his opinions on various issues. He initially felt that Benito Mussolini had done a good job during his rule, but his feelings on Mussolini quickly became negative as time passed. When visited by one of Mussolini's messengers, Pio yelled at the man, "So now you come to me, after you have destroyed Italy. You can tell Mussolini that nothing can save Italy now! Nothing!" Pio also thought highly of the U.S. President Franklin D. Roosevelt, who he described as a "great man." Additionally, Pio expressed great concern over the spread of communism during his life and frequently prayed to help combat it.

In 1948, in a letter written to Alcide De Gasperi, Pio noted his support for the Christian Democracy party.Pio's involvement is attributed to having helped the party win elections, with Italian communists hating Pio for it. One communist spokesman grumbled that Pio's presence at the voting polls "took votes away from us."

Following the Christian Democracy's political victories in elections, Pio was continually consulted by political Italian leaders including Aldo Moro, Antonio Segni, Mariano Rumor, and Giovanni Leone. Pio received letters requesting his prayers throughout his life, including one from Alfonso XIII in March 1923. Pio also prayed for various notable political figures, including George V.

In 1963, following the assassination of John F. Kennedy, Pio broke down in tears. When asked by another priest if he would pray for Kennedy's salvation, Pio replied "It's not necessary. He's already in Paradise."

The Italian historian Sergio Luzzatto, a specialist of the history of Italian fascism, wrote in 2011 a biography of Padre Pio in which he suggests that a "clerical-fascist mixture" developed around Padre Pio. Luzzatto relates that in August 1920, on the feast of the Assumption, Pio blessed a flag for a group of local veterans who were trying to develop links with local fascists to fight against communists. He suggests that Caradonna mounted a "praetorian guard" around Padre Pio to prevent any attempts to remove him from the monastery and transfer him elsewhere.

Posthumous veneration

Canonization 

In 1982, the Holy See authorized the archbishop of Manfredonia to open an investigation to determine whether Pio should be canonized. The investigation continued for seven years. In 1990, Pio was declared a Servant of God, the first step in the process of canonization. The investigation, however, did not lead to any public factual clearance by the Church on his previous 'excommunication' or on the allegations that his stigmata were not of a supernatural kind. Moreover, Pio's stigmata were remarkably left out of the obligatory investigations for the canonization process, in order to avoid obstacles prohibiting a successful closure.

Beginning in 1990, the Congregation for the Causes of Saints debated how Padre Pio had lived his life, and in 1997 Pope John Paul II declared him venerable. A discussion of the effects of his life on others followed. Cases were studied such as a reported cure of an Italian woman, Consiglia de Martino, associated with Padre Pio's intercession. In 1999, on the advice of the Congregation, John Paul II declared Padre Pio blessed. A media offensive by the Capuchins was able to realise a broad acceptation of the contested saint in society.

After further consideration of Padre Pio's virtues and ability to do good even after his death, including discussion of another healing attributed to his intercession, John Paul II declared Padre Pio a saint on 16 June 2002. An estimated 300,000 people attended the canonization ceremony in Rome.

Pilgrimage sites

The town of San Giovanni Rotondo, where Padre Pio spent most of his life, is the main pilgrimage site dedicated to his memory. The Santa Maria delle Grazie Church, which is the church of the capuchin monastery where Padre Pio celebrated mass, has become a pilgrimage site for his followers after his death in 1968. As the number of pilgrims kept increasing over the years, the Capuchins decided to build a new shrine near the church. The construction of the shrine began in 1991 and was completed in 2004. On 1 July 2004, John Paul II dedicated the Sanctuary of Saint Pio of Pietrelcina, sometimes referred as the Padre Pio Pilgrimage Church. The sanctuary has a capacity of around 6,000 people and its parvis has a 30,000 capacity. The relics of Padre Pio are located in the crypt of the new sanctuary and displayed for veneration by the pilgrims.

The town of Pietrelcina, where Padre Pio grew up, is another pilgrimage site which became popular among devotees. The sites which can be visited by pilgrims in Pietrelcina include Pio's family house where he was born, his room in an ancient tower in which he stayed as a friar when he was ill, the Santa Anna Church where he was baptized, the Santa Maria degli Angeli Church, where he was ordained a deacon prior to becoming a priest, and the Capuchin Church of the Holy Family. It is estimated that around two millions pilgrims come to Pietrelcina every year.

Sanctuaries and places dedicated to the veneration of Padre Pio outside Italy include the Padre Pio Shrine in Santo Tomas, Batangas in the Philippines and the National Center for Padre Pio in Barto, Pennsylvania, in the United States.

Pontifical visits
Popes have encouraged popular devotion to Padre Pio in various ways, notably by visiting the places associated with his life and ministry. San Giovanni Rotondo, where Padre Pio spent most of his life and where his shrine is located, was visited by Pope John Paul II, Pope Benedict XVI and Pope Francis. Pietrelcina, Padre Pio's birthplace, was visited by Pope Francis.

Pope John Paul II had much admiration for Padre Pio even before he became Pope. In 1947, as a young priest studying in Rome, Karol Wojtyła made a pilgrimage to San Giovanni Rotondo to meet Padre Pio in person. He returned to San Giovanni Rotondo as a cardinal, in 1974. He visited San Giovanni Rotondo again in May 1987 as Pope John Paul II, to celebrate the 100th anniversary of Padre Pio's birth.

On 21 June 2009, Pope Benedict XVI visited San Giovanni Rotondo as a pastoral visit. He visited the Santa Maria delle Grazie Church to venerate of the relics of Padre Pio in the crypt, celebrated mass and met with various people, including with the sick and the employees of the Casa Sollievo della Sofferenza.

Pope Francis has also supported popular devotion to Padre Pio. During the Extraordinary Jubilee of Mercy, he requested that Padre Pio's relics be exposed for veneration in St. Peter's Basilica from 8 to 14 February 2016. On 17 March 2018, he visited both Pietrelcina and San Giovanni Rotondo to celebrate the 50th anniversary of his death.

Exhumation

On 3 March 2008, the body of Pio was exhumed from his crypt, forty years after his death, so that his remains could be prepared for display. A church statement described the body as being in "fair condition". Archbishop Domenico Umberto D'Ambrosio, Papal legate to the shrine in San Giovanni Rotondo, stated "the top part of the skull is partly skeletal but the chin is perfect and the rest of the body is well preserved". Archbishop D’Ambrosio also confirmed in a communiqué that "the stigmata are not visible." He said that Pio's hands "looked like they had just undergone a manicure". It was hoped that morticians would be able to restore the face so that it would be recognizable. However, because of its deterioration, his face was covered with a lifelike silicone mask. This mask was made from a 1968 photograph of Padre Pio's body by the London-based Gems Studio, which usually works for wax museums and ethnological museums.

Cardinal José Saraiva Martins, prefect for the Congregation for the Causes of the Saints, celebrated Mass for 15,000 devotees on April 24 at the Shrine of Holy Mary of Grace, San Giovanni Rotondo, before the body went on display in a crystal, marble, and silver sepulcher in the crypt of the monastery. Padre Pio is wearing his brown Capuchin habit with a white silk stole embroidered with crystals and gold thread. His hands hold a large wooden cross. 800,000 pilgrims worldwide, mostly from Italy, made reservations to view the body up to December 2008, but only 7,200 people a day were able to file past the crystal coffin. Officials extended the display through September 2009.

Pio's remains were placed in the church of Saint Pio, which is beside San Giovanni Rotondo. In April 2010 they were moved to a special golden crypt.

Worldwide devotion 

Padre Pio has become one of the world's most popular saints. There are more than 3,000 "Padre Pio Prayer Groups" worldwide, with three million members. The first St Padre Pio parish in the world was established 16 June 2002 in Kleinburg, Ontario, Canada. There are parishes in Vineland and Lavallette, New Jersey, and Sydney, Australia, and shrines in Buena, New Jersey, and Santo Tomas, Batangas, Philippines, dedicated to Padre Pio. A 2006 survey by the magazine Famiglia Cristiana found that more Italian Catholics pray to Padre Pio for intercession than to any other figure.

The remains of Saint Pio were brought to the Vatican for veneration during the 2015–2016 Extraordinary Jubilee of Mercy. Saint Pio and Saint Leopold Mandic were designated as saint-confessors to inspire people to become reconciled to the Church and to God, by the confession of their sins.

Saint Pio of Pietrelcina was named the patron saint of civil defence volunteers, after a group of 160 petitioned the Italian Bishops’ conference for this designation. The bishops forwarded the request to the Vatican, which gave its approval to the designation. He is also "less officially" known as the patron saint of stress relief and the January blues", after the Catholic Enquiry Office in London proclaimed him as such. They designated the most depressing day of the year, identified as the Monday closest to January 22, as Don't Worry Be Happy Day, in honor of Padre Pio's famous advice:  "Pray, hope, and don’t worry."

Iconography
Padre Pio's iconography has been widely reproduced on devotional items and statues throughout Italy and the world, even before his beatification and canonization. His portrait can be seen in Italy in many churches as well as in private homes and public places, such as shops restaurants. In religious art, he is usually depicted in his brown Capuchin habit with gloves covering his stigmata.

Statues of Padre Pio have been erected in Italy and in other countries, including in the United States, the Philippines and Malta. In the St. Padre Pio Shrine in Landisville, New Jersey, there is a statue of Padre Pio built in and imported from Italy. A statue of Pio in Messina, Sicily, attracted attention in 2002 when it supposedly wept tears of blood. In Italy, near the coast of the Capraia island in the Mediterranean Sea, there is an underwater statue of Padre Pio at 40 feet (13 meters) deep, submerged in 1998.

In 2021, the construction of a new sanctuary dedicated to Padre Pio started on a hill overlooking Cebu City, in the Philippines, with a 100-foot-tall statue of Padre Pio. The same year a statue of Padre Pio was inaugurated in the Padre Pio Shrine in Santo Tomas, Batangas, Philippines.

See also
 Padre Pio: Miracle Man
 Padre Pio (film)
 Padre Pio TV
 Sanctuary of Saint Pio of Pietrelcina
 Victim soul
 Visions of Jesus and Mary

References

Citations

Sources
 
 
 
 
 
 
 
 
 
 
 
 Guarino, Mario: Beato impostore, Kaos Edizioni, Mailand, 1999

External links

 "Padre Pio de Pietrelcina" in Vatican News Service
 Padre Pio of Pietrelcina – Official website 
 Magazine The Voice of Padre Pio – Official website 
 Sanctuary of Saint Pio of Pietrelcina – Official Website 
 Padre Pio of Pietrelcina – Official TV and radio channels 
 Padre Pio of Pietrelcina – Books and religious gifts 
 Padre Pio Foundation of America
 Padre Pio 2000 Movie
 Prayers by Padre Pio
 All about Padre Pio

Unofficial biographies
 The New York Times, April 25, 2008: "Italian Saint Stirs Up a Mix of Faith and Commerce".

1887 births
1968 deaths
20th-century Christian saints
20th-century Christian mystics
Capuchins
Capuchin saints
Catholic exorcists
Roman Catholic mystics
Angelic visionaries
Franciscan saints
Marian visionaries
People from the Province of Benevento
Stigmatics
Beatifications by Pope John Paul II
Canonizations by Pope John Paul II
Miracle workers
Italian Franciscans
Venerated Catholics by Pope John Paul II
Italian exorcists
San Giovanni Rotondo
Italian Roman Catholic saints